Mohammad Ahmad Muslim Al Khalayleh (born 1967) is the Jordanian Minister of Awqaf Islamic Affairs and Holy Places. He was appointed as minister on 7 November 2019.

References 

Living people
21st-century Jordanian politicians
Government ministers of Jordan
Year of birth missing (living people)